The University Hospitals Cleveland Browns Radio Network is an American radio network composed of 24 radio stations which carry English-language coverage of the Cleveland Browns, a professional football team in the National Football League (NFL).

Since 2013, Cleveland market stations WKNR, WKRK-FM, and WNCX have served as the network's three flagships. The network also includes 21 affiliates in the U.S. states of Ohio, Pennsylvania, West Virginia and New York: ten AM stations, eight of which supplement their signals with a low-power FM translator; and eleven full-power FM stations, one of which supplements its signal with a low-power FM translator. Jim Donovan is the lead announcer along with Nathan Zegura and sideline analyst/reporter Je'Rod Cherry.

In addition to traditional over-the-air AM and FM broadcasts, network programming airs on satellite radio via Sirius XM and is available online via Sirius XM, TuneIn and NFL+. The University Hospitals Health System of Cleveland, Ohio, has owned the naming rights to the network since the 2017 season.

History

Original franchise (1946–1995) 

Radio broadcasts for the Cleveland Browns date back to the team's inaugural 1946 season in the All-America Football Conference, with WGAR as the initial flagship station; WGAR sportscaster Bob Neal and Stan Gee were the team's first announcers. Bill Mayer took over as Neal's color commentator in 1947 in addition to his duties as WGAR's morning drive host. WGAR also carried a weekly 15-minute show during the football season by head coach Paul Brown, the Browns' co-founder and namesake. A five-station network was assembled for the 1948 season consisting of WGAR, WATG in Ashland, WBNS in Columbus, WHIO in Dayton, WFRO-FM in Fremont, WJEL in Springfield and WTRF in Bellaire; stations in Lima, Toledo, Zanesville, Marion and Cincinnati were added the following year. By 1952, the network spanned 16 stations in Ohio, West Virginia, Kentucky and Pennsylvania.

WGAR served as the flagship until the 1950 season, the team's first with the National Football League, when WERE took over; Neal also moved to WERE but was replaced due to his announcing for Cleveland Indians telecasts being sponsored by Pfeiffer Brewing Co., rival to the Brewing Corp. of America which sponsored the Browns network. WTAM carried the games in 1952 and 1953 with Ken Coleman as announcer, WGAR reclaimed the flagship rights the following year. Through all but one year of WGAR's second stint as flagship, Bill McColgan handled play-by-play; while Bill Kelly returned in 1954, Jim Graner replaced him as color commentator the following year. Gib Shanley took over as the team's sole announcer 1961 in addition to becoming WGAR's sports director and announcer for Ohio State football.

The games moved back to WERE in 1962, with the network consisting of over 50 radio stations. WHK took over as flagship in 1968 when WERE signed up with the Cincinnati Bengals Radio Network (the Bengals were also founded by Paul Brown). By the 1974 season, the network consisted of WHK and 34 affiliates, including three stations in Pennsylvania; all but five stations broadcast on the AM band. Shanley was paired with Graner beginning in 1963 and continued in their roles until the start of the 1975 season, when Graner retired after being diagnosed with a brain tumor. Jim Mueller took over for Graner as color commentator.

WHK's role as flagship ended when team owner Art Modell tried unsuccessfully to move the broadcast rights onto WJW, a station he had owned since 1977 but consistently lost money on. Robert Gries, a minority owner, sued Modell on charges of anti-competitive practices on December 15, 1983, while WHK exercised an option to carry the team through the 1984 season which was also Gib Shanley's last as lead announcer. Modell's syndicate, Lake Erie Broadcasting signed a multi-year deal with the team on February 18, 1985, sold WJW and purchased WWWE and WDOK, transferring the broadcast rights to the latter two stations.

Doug Dieken, who recently retired after 14 seasons as left tackle for the team, expressed a desire to become one of the announcers and joined Mueller and Nev Chandler as color commentator beginning in 1985; Mueller left after the 1986 season. Lake Erie sold both stations in 1987 but WWWE carried the games until 1991, while WLTF took over as FM flagship in 1990. WHK and WMMS signed a three-year contract in 1991, prevailing in a bidding war over WKNR and WWWE/WLTF. WKNR subsequently teamed up with WDOK for a two-year contract in 1994 with game coverage produced by a third party on behalf of the team.

Prior to the 1994 season, Nev Chandler died from colon cancer on August 7, with Casey Coleman (son of Ken Coleman and a water boy for the team during Ken's tenure as announcer) taking over as lead announcer alongside Dieken. Coleman's tenure as announcer was complicated by his public support of then-head coach Bill Belichick, whom the fan base disapproved of, along with Chandler's substantial popularity and acclaim. The 1995 season became overshadowed by the team's announced relocation to Baltimore by Modell mid-season. WKNR and WDOK continued to carry the games for the remainder of the season, but with public service announcements airing after the majority of advertisers cancelled their sponsorships. For the team's last two seasons, the Browns radio network had 40 affiliates in 1994 and 49 in 1995.

During the 1997 and 1998 NFL seasons, WKNR originated Countdown to '99, a weekly hour-long program co-hosted by Dieken and Marc Kestecher over many former Browns radio network affiliates. WKNR produced the show on behalf of an intellectual property trust established by the NFL during the franchise's interregnum.

Expansion franchise (1999–present) 

Following reactivation of the Cleveland Browns franchise in 1999, flagship rights were awarded to Jacor (with a pending merger into Clear Channel) with WMJI as the flagship and WTAM simulcasting the majority of games which did not conflict with the station's Indians and Cavaliers commitments. Jim Donovan was named as the team's lead announcer, joining Dieken and Coleman, who was now the team's sideline reporter. Secondary programming, including a weekly show featuring the Browns head coach, aired exclusively on WTAM. The flagship rights were transferred to WMMS for the 2002 season in a bid to boost that station's low ratings.

Coleman, who was also a co-host on WTAM's morning-drive program, remained as sideline reporter until his death on November 28, 2006, after a year-long battle with pancreatic cancer. The team honored Coleman the previous month by renaming the field house at their Berea, Ohio, indoor practice facility after him. WTAM sportscaster/team beat reporter Andre Knott filled in for Coleman during the 2006 season and took over the role on a full-time basis the following season. The Browns replaced Knott with team employee Jamir Howerton at the start of the 2010 season and again with Nathan Zegura in 2014. During the 2011 season, Donovan missed two regular season games following his treatment for leukemia earlier in the year; WTAM sports director Mike Snyder filled in both times.

On March 28, 2013, the Cleveland Browns announced a new long-term deal with Good Karma Broadcasting and CBS Radio, awarding the flagship rights to Good Karma's WKNR and CBS Radio's WKRK-FM and WNCX. WKNR had already been airing Cleveland Browns Daily, an hour-long program produced year-round by the team, since July 2011 via a cooperative agreement; under this contract, the show expanded to two hours as a centerpiece of over 1,000 annual hours of ancillary team-produced programming. Craig Karmazin, founder of Good Karma, proposed the deal with CBS, likening it to the existing CBS–Turner Sports co-op for NCAA men's basketball tournament coverage and saw the Browns being such a strong community asset that it could be workable. This arrangement between Good Karma and Entercom (succeeding owners of WKRK-FM and WNCX; now named Audacy, Inc.) was renewed effective with the 2020 season.

During Baker Mayfield's rookie season as Cleveland Browns quarterback, KREF in Norman, Oklahoma, joined the network on October 5, 2018, for the remainder of the 2018 season. KREF owner Randy Laffoon made the arrangement to provide Oklahoma Sooners fans a chance to follow Mayfield, having previously carried St. Louis Rams games after that team drafted former Sooner quarterback Sam Bradford. KAKC in Tulsa, Oklahoma, signed a three-year affiliation deal prior to the 2019 season after discovering the Mayfield-led Browns drew higher television ratings that the Dallas Cowboys in Oklahoma City. Both stations dropped their affiliations after Mayfield's 2022 departure from the team.

Doug Dieken announced his retirement as color commentator at the conclusion of the 2021 season, concluding a 37-year run in broadcasting and 51 years  of involvement with the team; the radio broadcast booth at FirstEnergy Stadium was renamed in his honor. Nathan Zegura was subsequently named as Dieken's replacement in the booth, while former NFL player and WKNR afternoon host Je'Rod Cherry was named the team's new sideline reporter.

Programming 
Network programming includes a four-hour pregame show and a two-hour postgame show, in addition to all games being called live on-site; WKNR originates the pregame show while WKRK-FM originates the postgame show. WKNR and WKRK-FM simulcast some ancillary team-produced programming for the network including a Wednesday night preview show and a Thursday night program with the team's head coach (Kevin Stefanski), while weekday afternoon program Cleveland Browns Daily originates over WKNR on a year-round basis.

Timelines

Announcers

Station list

Blue background indicates low-power FM translator.

Network maps

Notes

References

External links 
Browns Radio Network
SiriusXM.com: Cleveland Browns
TuneIn.com: Cleveland Browns

National Football League on the radio
Radio in Cleveland
Sports radio networks in the United States